The 2023 FIM Bajas World Cup season is the 12th season of the FIM Bajas World Cup, an international rally raid competition for motorbikes, quads and SSVs.

Calendar
The calendar for the 2023 season is scheduled to have eight rounds, with some of the events also being part of 2023 FIA World Cup for Cross-Country Bajas. The exact dates for rounds six and eight are yet to be confirmed.

Regulations
The following classes and categories are included:
Category 1: Bike (Up to 450cc single or twin cylinder, 2T or 4T)
Category 2: Quads (three-wheel vehicles are forbidden)
Category 3: SSV World Cup (Up to 1050cc)
Class 1: Women World Cup
Class 2: Junior World Cup
Class 3: Veteran Trophy

The FIM will award the World Cup to both riders and manufacturers of the bike category; also to riders only in the quad, and SSV (driver and co-driver) categories, as well as to riders only in the woman, and junior classes. A Trophy is awarded to the winners of the veterans category. Any other category, i.e. “Over 450cc” do not count for any of the FIM Baja World Cups.

Teams and riders

Results

Motorbikes

Quads

SSVs

Championship standings

Riders' championship
 Points for final positions are awarded as follows:

A rider's best six results will count towards their final position in the final standings.

Motorbikes

Quads

Women

Junior

Veteran

SSVs

Manufacturers Championship
 Points for manufacturers are awarded by the points of the top two riders per manufacturer at each baja being added together:

References

External links
 

Bajas World Cup
Bajas
Bajas World Cup